Kosovo is a village in Bregovo Municipality, Vidin Province, Northwestern Bulgaria, located at

.

Villages in Vidin Province